The 1934 State of the Union Address was given on Wednesday, January 3, 1934, by the 32nd president of the United States, Franklin D. Roosevelt.  It was the first State of the Union address to be given in January.

Quotations

See also
United States House of Representatives elections, 1934

References

Presidency of Franklin D. Roosevelt
Speeches by Franklin D. Roosevelt
State of the Union addresses
73rd United States Congress
State of the Union Address
State of the Union Address
State of the Union Address
State of the Union Address
January 1934 events